The 1905–06 Penn State Nittany Lions basketball team represented Penn State University during the 1905–06 college men's basketball season. The team finished with a final record of 6–4.

Schedule

|-

References

Penn State Nittany Lions basketball seasons
Penn State
Penn State Nittany Lions Basketball Team
Penn State Nittany Lions basketball team